Bulldog Mansion, listed as Debut EP, is an EP released on May 10, 2000 by Korean pop rock band Bulldog Mansion.

Track listing
"Fever" – 5:01
"괜찮아!" – 4:41
"피터팬" – 4:07
"99" – 5:39
"아침에 문득" – 3:36
"Fever (DJ'tama'-vocal dub club mix)" – 5:25

External links

Notes

Bulldog Mansion albums
2000 debut EPs